Nicholas John "Nick" Currie (born 11 February 1960), more popularly known under the artist name Momus (after the Greek god of mockery), is a Scottish musician and writer.

For over forty years he has been releasing albums on labels in the United Kingdom, the United States, and Japan. In his lyrics and his other writing he makes use of continental philosophy, and has built up a personal world he says is "dominated by values like diversity, orientalism, and a respect for otherness".

Career

Musical 
Nicholas Currie's musical career began in 1981, with his band The Happy Family, featuring ex-members of Josef K, who made a single and a concept album The Man on Your Street: Songs of the Dictator Hall on hip UK indie label 4AD.

In 1986 Momus recorded an E.P. of his translations of Jacques Brel songs "Nicky", and wrote a lengthy article on Brel for the New Statesman. On 22 October 2009 he performed at the Barbican alongside fellow Brel enthusiasts Marc Almond and Camille O'Sullivan at a celebration of Brel's career Carousel: The Songs of Jacques Brel.

His album Don't Stop The Night included the single, "The Hairstyle of the Devil", which peaked at No. 94 in the UK Singles Chart in May 1989, and was also a local hit at San Francisco's KITS Live 105 radio station.

Momus' 1980s albums were a great influence on Jarvis Cocker, who wrote to Currie asking him to produce future Pulp albums. Those same albums were a huge influence on Brett Anderson, Currie's championing of Suede following his friendship with Anderson and particularly bass player Justine Frischmann got them early attention, before she left to form Elastica. Momus also features in Bad Vibes the memoir of Luke Haines's whom Currie dubbed 'The Hitler of Britpop'.

In the early 1990s, Momus struck up a working relationship with a number of J-Pop stars. A cult audience for Momus and the indie labels he had released his early records on - particularly el records - led to the formation community of musicians in Shibuya, Tokyo, and the founding of Cru-el records, and the emergence of 'ShibuyaKei' artists such as Cornelius and The Poison Girlfriend - who performed Momus songs. Currie began writing specifically for nOrikO (aka the Poison Girlfriend) and Kahimi Karie. In 1995 Kahimi Karie's Momus-penned song "Good Morning World" went to number one and was featured in a heavily syndicated advert, giving Currie his first real hit and financial stability for the first time.

Momus has continued to release music regularly. His 2020 album, Vivid, which documented the COVID-19 pandemic and Momus' own suspected case of the virus, earned some coverage in the mainstream media.

He has been the subject of a number of documentaries including Hannu Puttonen's Man of Letters.

As author

Momus has published a book of lyrics, and has written texts or introductions for several books on art and culture.

Momus has published six novels. The Book of Jokes and The Book of Scotlands received positive reviews in the LA Times and the Guardian. The Book of Scotlands (Sternberg Press) was shortlisted for the Scottish Arts Council's First Book prize. He published The Book of Japans in 2011, also on Sternberg Press, and UnAmerica in 2014, as well as several ebooks.

2020 saw the publication of Niche: a memoir in pastiche in which Momus tells the story of his creative life through fictional eyewitness statements from famous historic figures.

Blog and vlog

Momus said in 1991 that "In the future everyone will be famous for fifteen people", which has evolved into a meme, "On the web, everyone will be famous to fifteen people". The quip parodies Andy Warhol's famous prediction that, "In the future, everyone will be famous for fifteen minutes".

From January 15, 2004 to February 10, 2010, Momus wrote a blog on the LiveJournal platform called Click Opera. Initially a collection of links, Click Opera evolved to become a substantial daily cultural essay. After announcing it unexpectedly in an interview with magazine called Chronic'art, Momus ended the blog on his fiftieth birthday because it had become too time-consuming and because Livejournal was being wound down. It is cited a high point of the blogging era and led to Momus becoming a columnist with the New York Times and Wired.

Since 2016, Momus has been releasing a series of improvised lectures and travel vlogs called Open University.

Lawsuits 
In 1991 following the release of the album Hippopotamomus Momus was threatened with legal action by the Michelin tyre company for his song "Michelin Man" which saw the company's bibendum mascot as a metaphor for hypersexual rubber fetishism. Remaining copies of the album were destroyed, the track was withdrawn from subsequent pressings of the album, and the album's cover was amended to remove a hippo-headed pastiche of the Michelin Man character. The lyrics to the track were included in the lyric book Lusts of a Moron under the amended title "Made of Rubber". The 2018 box set Recreate restored both the track and title, with the accompanying booklet by Anthony Reynolds 'Sons of Pioneers', detailing the legal wrangle but not explaining the track's reinstatement.

In 1998, Momus was sued by the composer/musician Wendy Carlos for $22 million for his song "Walter Carlos" (from the album The Little Red Songbook, released that year), which postulated that the post–sexual reassignment surgery Wendy could travel back in time to marry her pre-surgery self, Walter. The case was settled out of court, with Momus agreeing to remove the song from subsequent editions of the CD and owing $30,000 in legal fees. Momus' following album Stars Forever consisted of commissioned biographical sketches in the style of the Wendy Carlos song, conceived as a crowdfunding exercise to pay Currie's legal fees.

Personal life 
Currie attended boarding school at the Edinburgh Academy while his father taught English for the British Council in Athens.

Since 1984 Momus has lived in London, Paris, Tokyo, New York, Berlin, and Osaka. He currently splits his time between Berlin and Paris. He is an atheist.

In 1994, at the age of 34, he married his 17-year-old girlfriend. She was 14 when they first met. According to his blog, they later divorced.

In December 1997, he contracted acanthamoeba keratitis in his right eye due to a contact lens mishap sustained whilst on holiday in Greece, causing loss of vision on that side. Although his sight subsequently improved following surgery, he has suffered lingering effects from the infection since, causing him to often be photographed in an eyepatch, wearing dark glasses, or squinting.

His cousin is musician Justin Currie, the lead singer and songwriter of Del Amitri.

Bibliography

Discography

Studio albums

 Circus Maximus (1986)
 The Poison Boyfriend (1987)
 Tender Pervert (1988)
 Don't Stop the Night (1989)
 Hippopotamomus (1991)
 The Ultraconformist (Live Whilst Out of Fashion) (1992)
 Voyager (1992)
 Timelord (1993)
 Slender Sherbert (1995)
 The Philosophy of Momus (1995)
 Ping Pong (1997)
 The Little Red Songbook (1998)
 Stars Forever (1999)
 Folktronic (2001)
 Oskar Tennis Champion (2003)
 Summerisle, a collaboration with Anne Laplantine (2004)
 Otto Spooky (2005)
 Ocky Milk (2006)
 Joemus, a collaboration with Joe Howe (2008)
 Hypnoprism (2010)
 Thunderclown, a collaboration with John Henriksson (2011)
 Bibliotek (2012)
 In Samoa (2012)
 Sunbutler, a collaboration with Joe Howe (2012)
 MOMUSMCCLYMONT, a collaboration with David McClymont (2013)
 Bambi (2013)
 MOMUSMCCLYMONT II, a collaboration with David McClymont (2014)
 Turpsycore (2015)
 Glyptothek (2015)
 Scobberlotchers (2016)
 Pillycock (2017)
 Pantaloon (2018)
 Akkordion (2019)
 Vivid (2020)
 Athenian (2021)
 Smudger (2022)
 Issyvoo (2022)

Compilations

 Monsters of Love (1990)
 Learning to Be Human (1994)
 Twenty Vodka Jellies (1996)
 Stop This (1998)
 Forbidden Software Timemachine (2003)
 Pubic Intellectual: An Anthology 1986-2016 (3 CD Box set) (2016)
 Procreate (3CD Box Set) (2017)
 Recreate (3 CD Box set) (2018)

Singles and EPs

 The Beast With 3 Backs (1985)
 Murderers, The Hope of Women (1986)
 Nicky (1986)
 The Hairstyle of the Devil UK #94 (1989)
 Spacewalk (1992)
 The Sadness of Things (1995)
 The Thunderclown (2011)
 The Synthy EP (2021)

References

External links 
Momus' Official Site
Click Opera (Momus' now-defunct LiveJournal blog)

 (1)
 (2)

1960 births
Living people
Creation Records artists
Folktronica musicians
Writers from Paisley, Renfrewshire
Alumni of the University of Aberdeen
Scottish atheists
Shibuya-kei musicians
Avant-pop musicians
Scottish bloggers
Scottish expatriates in Germany
Scottish expatriates in Japan
Scottish songwriters
Journalists from Paisley, Renfrewshire
Musicians from Paisley, Renfrewshire
Cherry Red Records artists